Lion Wood is a   Local Nature Reserve in Norwich in Norfolk. It is owned and managed by Norwich City Council.

Around a third of this wood is believed to be ancient. The dominant trees are oak and sycamore, and there is a variety of woodland birds such as blackcaps and green and greater spotted woodpeckers.

The wood is open to the public.

References

Local Nature Reserves in Norfolk